New Mexico State Road 47 (NM 47) is a  state highway in Bernalillo, Valencia, and Socorro Counties in New Mexico. NM 47's southern terminus is at an intersection with U.S. Route 60 (US 60). The highway then proceeds north intersecting with Interstate 25 (I-25) before the northern terminus at an intersection with NM 556.

Route description

NM 47 begins at an intersection with U.S. Highway 60 in rural Socorro County and proceeds northwest, soon entering Valencia County. The route reaches the Rio Grande at the town of Rio Communities, from which one can cross the Rio Grande on NM 309 to reach Belen. At this junction, NM 47 turns slightly east of north and follows the eastern shore of the Rio Grande, opposite from NM 314 and I-25. It enters Bernalillo County at Isleta Pueblo and continues to the northeast, where it has a system interchange with Interstate 25. As the route begins to enter the Albuquerque metropolitan area, it takes on the name Broadway Boulevard and enters the city limits of South Valley, where it intersects NM 500 (Rio Bravo Boulevard). Shortly thereafter, it enters the Albuquerque city limits, continuing northeast through the heart of downtown. After crossing Interstate 40, the route turns west onto Candelaria Road to cross the BNSF railroad line. NM 47 then turns back to the north on 2nd Street, which it follows for the rest of its existence. The route passes briefly through the limits of North Valley, in which it intersects NM 423 (Paseo Del Norte) and NM 528 (Alameda Boulevard). The route finally comes to an end at NM 556 (Roy Road) just short of the Sandoval County line.

Major intersections

See also

 List of state roads in New Mexico

References

External links

047
Transportation in Socorro County, New Mexico
Transportation in Valencia County, New Mexico
Transportation in Bernalillo County, New Mexico
Transportation in Albuquerque, New Mexico